TV Bailadores o TVCB  es un Canal de Televisión Comunitaria en Bailadores, estado Mérida - Venezuela.  Pertenece a una fundación sin fines de lucro llamada en la actualidad "Fundación de Medios Comunitarios de Bailadores" que engloba básicamente 3 medios de comunicación social: La Televisora (TVCB), Agrícola FM y Carú FM. Es la primera Televisora en el ámbito comunitario fundada en Venezuela.  

En 2002, se creó oficialmente la Fundación de Medios Comunitarios de Bailadores, y en marzo de 2008, después de recibir equipos y la habilitación de CONATEL, la televisora comunitaria de Bailadores salió al aire por señal abierta a través del canal 64 que emite en la zona del Valle del Mocotíes y parte del estado Mérida y Táchira. Igualmente sigue emitiéndose por el sistema de Televisión por Cable de Bailadores, Tovar Sat y Parabólicas Tovar.

Inicios de TVCB (Televisora Comunitaria de Bailadores)
La televisora TVCB (Televisora Comunitaria de Bailadores) fue fundada el 11 de Noviembre de 1993 en el estado de Mérida por el Dr. Carlos Andrés Pérez Medina con el nombre de "Telestar" a través de un sistema de televisión por cable, conocido con el nombre de "TELECABAI", ofrecía inicialmente 11 canales internacionales y nacionales adaptándose a las demandas del público con el tiempo. Al principio, la señal solo cubría el área urbana de Bailadores y gradualmente aumentó su alcance. En el canal 3, se reservaba una señal artesanal hecha con una cámara Handicam SONY CCD-F201 propiedad del Dr. Carlos Andrés. Los programas se transmitían los jueves, viernes y/o sábados a las 8 PM y eran grabados con cámaras controladas por Amílcar Pérez, Gustavo Carrero, Andrés Pereira y voluntarios anónimos. Los hacían en una habitación donde estaban los equipos decodificadores de las parabólicas, luego los trasladaron a una habitación aislada de los equipos y donde siempre llegaba gente a ver como emitían, eran el público, pero que a la vez también ayudaban o pasando un cable, o encendiendo una luz o mandando a callar mientras emitían, eran transmisiones espontáneas, sin guión pero realizadas con un sentido muy grande de pertenencia y cariño al público al que llegaban.  Algunos de los programas más destacados incluían "Tertuliando con...", "Cabildo Abierto" y "Noticias TVCB". La señal sufrió varios obstáculos, siendo cerrada en dos oportunidades por CONATEL con el apoyo de la Guardia Nacional, a pesar de lo cual logró permanecer en el aire hasta aproximadamente el año 2007. Las corridas de toros, los concursos de caballos de paso y la elección de las reinas de las ferias Agropecuarias fueron un desafío técnico, pero la televisora logró transmitirlas y llevar el entretenimiento a aquellos que no podían salir de sus casas o pagar entradas. La noche de las corridas, los participantes se reunían para ver, verse a si mismo y en muchos casos reírse de sí mismos, sus vecinos, amigos o familiares, debido a que siempre habían incidentes con los animales que se presentaban.  

La televisora comunitaria es un importante canal de comunicación para los habitantes del municipio Rivas Dávila y de otros municipios cercanos, ya que les brinda la oportunidad de plantear sus inquietudes y resolver los problemas que enfrentan en su comunidad. A través de este medio, los televidentes pueden ser escuchados a nivel regional y recibir la atención necesaria para solucionar sus dificultades.

2023: 15 Aniversario 
En el año 2002 aproximadamente, se dio inicio a la creación oficial de la Fundación de Medios Comunitarios de Bailadores, cuando Milton Ramírez tomó la iniciativa de crearla, mientras que el alcalde de ese entonces no podía ejercer funciones en la fundación. Se llevó a cabo la elaboración del documento fundacional que, una vez enviado a CONATEL, fue modificado y adaptado a los requerimientos de la época.  

Finalmente, el 14 de marzo de 2008, después de recibir todos los equipos por parte del MINCI y la habilitación por parte de CONATEL, se transmitió por primera vez la señal de la Televisora Comunitaria de Bailadores.

El 15 de marzo de 2023, se llevó a cabo un evento en el Teatro Municipal de Bailadores, en el estado de Mérida, Venezuela, para celebrar los 15 años de la inauguración de la sede de los medios comunitarios y el lanzamiento de la señal del canal 64 UHF en todo el Valle del Mocotíes. La Televisora Comunitaria de Bailadores, Carú Comunitaria y Agrícola FM transmitieron en vivo el evento, y también se transmitió a través de Instagram en vivo.

Durante el evento, se presentaron grupos tradicionales de danzas, como las danzas Carú, música campesina como el Grupo Frailejón de Ali Romero, el violinista y lutier Victor Suarez y el grupo Swing Andino de Fernando Medina, así como el Mariachi Veracruz. También hubo varias presentaciones de cantantes locales, que deleitaron a los asistentes con su talento y repertorio musical. Incluso, la alcaldesa se unió a la celebración y, contagiada por el ambiente festivo, se puso su falda de danza tradicional venezolana y también bailó. Además, se presentó la nueva imagen de la Televisora Comunitaria de Bailadores. Para añadir más entretenimiento al evento, se contó con la participación de magos, quienes sorprendieron al público con sus trucos de ilusionismo.

La Comunicadora Social Rocío Castellanos amenizó el evento, y también estuvo presente la Alcaldesa del Municipio para dar un discurso de felicitación y reconocimiento al esfuerzo y dedicación de la Televisora Comunitaria de Bailadores en promover la cultura y la diversidad en la zona.

Además, se hizo un paseo por la historia de la Televisora, lo que permitió a los asistentes y televidentes reflexionar sobre el papel fundamental de los medios y el esfuerzo de las personas que, a través del tiempo y de manera desinteresada, han sacado adelante esta institución comunitaria.

En general, el evento fue un éxito en términos de promover la cultura local y la importancia de los medios comunitarios para su difusión. Tanto los asistentes como los televidentes pudieron disfrutar de una celebración llena de entretenimiento y aprendizaje acerca de la historia y la importancia de la Televisora Comunitaria de Bailadores en la zona.

TELECABAI 
TELECABAI o Televisión por Cable de Bailadores, nace por iniciativa del Dr. Carlos Andrés Pérez Medina en el corazón del pueblo de Bailadores, en el estado Mérida. Para ese entonces en Venezuela habían 4 Televisoras de alcance nacional: Radio Caracas Televisión, Venevisión, Venezolana de Televisión y Televen, a nivel regional estaba la señal de la Televisora Andina de Mérida. Por la Abrupta configuración topográfica de la zona en el casco urbano de Bailadores era muy difícil obtener la señal de alguno de esos canales. El Doctor Carlos Andrés Pérez Medina, compra de su propio bolsillo una parabólica, pero decide de cierto modo compartir la señal con sus vecinos. Con la ayuda de algunos técnicos comenzó a "compartir" la señal de las parabólicas con sus vecinos y vio la oportunidad de poder compartir esa experiencia con todo el pueblo, por lo que con un grupo de amigos y técnicos conforman lo que llamarían TELECABAI.  

List of Venezuelan television channels

Television networks in Venezuela
Television stations in Venezuela
Television channels and stations established in 2004
Mass media in Venezuela
2004 establishments in Venezuela
Television in Venezuela
Spanish-language television stations